Bovy Sor Udomson (โบวี่ ส.อุดมศร) born January 21, 1984, is a Thai Muay Thai kickboxer. He is known for his iron chin and brawling fighting style.

Biography and career
Bovy Sor Udomson was born as Piyapong Chuanpo in Kalasin Province in Northeastern (Isan) region of Thailand. He had his first fight at the age of 13.

He currently fights out of Chokmuay Belgium, in Belgium but still train in Sitsongpeenong Gym in Bangkok.

He defeated Akihiro Gono via TKO (referee stoppage) in round one at Shootboxing 2012 - Act 4 on September 17, 2012, in Tokyo, Japan to qualify for the 2012 S-Cup.

He competed at the Shoot Boxing World Tournament 2012 in Tokyo, Japan on November 17, 2012 where he lost a majority decision (29-29, 30-29, 30-29) against Henri van Opstal at the quarter-final stage.

He defeated Victor Nagbe to win the Muay Thai Warriors Super Welterweight (69 kg) title in Macau on December 9, 2012.

He lost to Warren Stevelmans by way of majority decision at Shootboxing 2013 - Act 1 in Tokyo on February 22, 2013.

He lost to Hiroaki Suzuki by unanimous decision at Shootboxing 2013 - Act 4 in Tokyo, Japan on September 23, 2013.

He lost to Kuniyoshi Hironaka by second-round KO at Shoot Boxing Battle Summit Ground Zero Tokyo 2013 in Tokyo, Japan on November 15, 2013.

Charleville Meziere in France on mei 17, 2014.
No contest because of a fight in the audience during the 5th round and 3rd count against Mohamed Galaoui, the officials did not gave a decision, is he first fight for Chokmuay Belgium

Titles and accomplishments
Muay Thai Warriors
2012 Muay Thai Warriors Super Welterweight (69 kg) champion
OneSongchai Promotions
2009 S1 Battle Lightweight (135 lbs / 61 kg) champion
World Muaythai Council
W.M.C. Lightweight (135 lbs / 61 kg) World Muaythai champion
Professional Boxing Association of Thailand
Thailand Featherweight (126 lbs / 57 kg) champion
Thailand Junior Featherweight (122 lbs / 55 kg) champion
Rajadamnern Stadium
2003 Rajadamnern Stadium Junior Featherweight (122 lbs / 55 kg) champion

Fight record

|-  style="background:#fbb;"
| 2015-10-24 || Loss ||align=left| Qiu Jianliang || WLF 2015  || Hong Kong, China || KO(Knee) || 1 || 
|-  style="background:#fbb;"
| 2015-01-31 || Loss ||align=left| Qiu Jianliang || Wu Lin Feng World Championship 2015 || Chongqing, China || Decision (unanimous) || 3 || 3:00
|- 
|-  bgcolor="#fbb"
| 2014-11-30|| Loss||align=left| Zakaria Zouggary || SHOOT BOXING WORLD TOURNAMENT S-cup 2014, Quarter FInal || Tokyo, Japan || KO || 2 || 0:20
|-  style="background:#c5d2ea;"
| 2014-05-17 || No contest ||align=left| Mohamed Galaoui || Radikal Fight France || || No contest || 5 || 2:30
|-  style="background:#fbb;"
| 2013-11-15 || Loss ||align=left| Kuniyoshi Hironaka || Shoot Boxing Battle Summit Ground Zero Tokyo 2013 || Tokyo, Japan || KO (right cross) || 2 || 
|-  style="background:#fbb;"
| 2013-09-23 || Loss ||align=left| Hiroaki Suzuki || Shootboxing 2013 - Act 4 || Tokyo, Japan || Decision (unanimous) || 3 || 3:00
|-  style="background:#fbb;"
| 2013-02-22 || Loss ||align=left| Warren Stevelmans || Shootboxing 2013 - Act 1 || Tokyo, Japan || Decision (majority) || 3 || 3:00
|-  style="background:#cfc;"
| 2012-12-09 || Win ||align=left| Victor Nagbe || Muay Thai Warriors || Macau || || || 
|-
! style=background:white colspan=9 |
|-  style="background:#fbb;"
| 2012-11-17 || Loss ||align=left| Henri van Opstal || Shoot Boxing World Tournament 2012, Quarter Finals || Tokyo, Japan || Decision (majority) || 3 || 3:00
|-  style="background:#cfc;"
| 2012-09-17 || Win ||align=left| Akihiro Gono || Shootboxing 2012 - Act 4 || Tokyo, Japan || TKO (referee stoppage) || 1 || 2:15
|-  style="background:#fbb;"
| 2012-05-27 || Loss ||align=left| Faldir Chahbari || SLAMM: Nederland vs. Thailand VII || Almere, Netherlands || Decision || 5 || 3:00 
|-  style="background:#fbb;"
| 2012-03-24 || Loss ||align=left| Chingiz Allazov || Oktagon - Fight Code 2012 || Milan, Italy  || KO || 1 ||  
|-  style="background:#fbb;"
| 2012-02-05 || Loss ||align=left| Satoru Suzuki || Shootboxing 2012 - Act 1 || Tokyo, Japan || Decision (Unanimous) || 3 || 3:00
|-  style="background:#cfc;"
| 2011-11-06 || Win ||align=left| Gago Drago || Shoot the Shooto 2011 || Tokyo, Japan || Decision (Unanimous) || 3 || 3:00
|-  style="background:#cfc;"
| 2011-09-10 || Win ||align=left| Toby Imada || Shootboxing 2011 - Act 4 || Tokyo, Japan || Decision (Unanimous) || 3 || 3:00
|-  style="background:#fbb;"
| 2011-08-27 || Loss ||align=left| Paulo Balicha || Swiss Las Vegas Challenge 4 || Basel, Switzerland || Decision || 3 || 3:00
|-  style="background:#fbb;"
| 2011-05-07 || Loss ||align=left| Hichem Chaibi || Fight Zone 5 || Villeurbanne, France || Decision || 5 || 3:00
|-  style="background:#fbb;"
| 2011-02-19 || Loss ||align=left| Hiroki Shishido || Shoot Boxing 2011 act.1 -SB166- || Korakuen Hall, Japan || Decision (Unanimous) || 5 || 3:00
|-  style="background:#fbb;"
| 2011-01-21 || Loss ||align=left| Antuan Siangboxing || Channel 3 || Suphanburi, Thailand || Decision || 5 || 3:00
|-
! style=background:white colspan=9 |
|-  style="background:#fbb;"
| 2010-11-23 || Loss ||align=left| Andy Souwer || Shoot Boxing Tournament 2010, Quarter-final || Bunkyō, Japan || KO (Right hook) || 3 || 0:47
|-  style="background:#cfc;"
| 2010-06-04 || Win ||align=left| Moussa Konaté || Ultimate Thai V / Muyathaitv Trophy || Paris, France || Decision || 5 || 3:00
|-  style="background:#cfc;"
| 2010-04-11 || Win ||align=left| Takaaki Umeno || Shootboxing 25th Anniversary : Ishin 2 || Tokyo, Japan || TKO (Referee Stoppage) || 2 || 
|-  style="background:#fbb;"
| 2010-03-27 || Loss ||align=left| Michael Dicks || England Vs Thailand 2010 || Manchester, England || Decision || 5 || 3:00
|-  style="background:#fbb;"
| 2009-11-29 || Loss ||align=left| Mosab Amrani || SLAMM!! Netherlands vs Thailand VI || Almere, Netherlands || KO || 1 || 
|-
! style=background:white colspan=9 |
|-  style="background:#cfc;"
| 2009-11-07 || Win ||align=left| Rudolf Durica || Thai Boxe || Padova, Italy || Decision || 5 || 3:00
|-  style="background:#cfc;"
| 2009-09-04 || Win ||align=left| Hiroki Shishido || Shootboxing 2009 -Bushido- || Tokyo, Japan || KO (Right hook) || 5 || 0:34
|-  style="background:#c5d2ea;"
| 2009-06-20 || Draw ||align=left| Kamel Jemel || Muaythai Gala in Levallois || Levallois, France || Decision draw || 5 || 3:00
|-  style="background:#cfc;"
| 2009-06-08 || Win ||align=left| Nopparat Keatkhamtorn || Suek Wansongchai, Rajadamnern Stadium || Bangkok, Thailand || Decision || 5 || 3:00
|-  style="background:#cfc;"
| 2009-05-09 || Win ||align=left| Mickael Piscitello || Thai Tournament III || Geneva, Switzerland || TKO (Referee Stoppage) || 4 || 
|-  style="background:#cfc;"
| 2009-05-02 || Win ||align=left| Puja Sor Suwannee || One Songchai Promotions || Thailand || Decision || 5 || 3:00
|-
! style=background:white colspan=9 |
|-  style="background:#fbb;"
| 2009-03-26 || Loss ||align=left| Fabio Pinca || Les Stars du Ring || Levallois, France || Decision || 5 || 3:00
|-  style="background:#;"
| 2009-03-06 || ||align=left| Nopparat Keatkhamtorn || Songchai || Maha Sarakham Province, Thailand || ||  || 
|-  style="background:#cfc;"
| 2009-01-18 || Win ||align=left| Vahid Rosyani || M.I.D. Japan presents "Thailand Japan" 2009 || Japan || TKO || 5 || 
|-  style="background:#fbb;"
| 2008-12-18 || Loss ||align=left| Petsanguan Sitniwat || Wansongchai Fights, Rajadamnern Stadium || Bangkok, Thailand || Decision || 5 || 3:00
|-  style="background:#cfc;"
| 2008-11-30 || Win ||align=left| Rachid Belaini || SLAMM!! Netherlands vs Thailand V || Almere, Netherlands || TKO (Cut) || 1 || 
|-  style="background:#cfc;"
| 2008-08-28 || Win ||align=left| Singtongnoi Por.Telakun || Suek Onesongchai, Rajadamnern Stadium || Bangkok, Thailand || TKO || 3 || 
|-  style="background:#fbb;"
| 2008-07-21 || Loss ||align=left| Phettho Sitjaopor || Phetthongkam Fights, Rajadamnern Stadium || Bangkok, Thailand || Decision || 5 || 3:00
|-  style="background:#fbb;"
| 2008-06-02 || Loss ||align=left| Pethsanguan || Songchai promotion - Channel 7 || Bangkok, Thailand || Decision || 5 || 3:00
|-  style="background:#cfc;"
| 2008-02-07 || Win ||align=left| Lamthong Tor Pornchai || Wanthongchai Fights, Rajadamnern Stadium || Bangkok, Thailand || Decision || 5 || 3:00
|-  style="background:#cfc;"
| 2007-11-24 || Win ||align=left| Nopparat Keatkhamtorn || Sukonesongchai Loi Krathong Superfights || Nonthaburi, Thailand || KO || 3 || 
|-  style="background:#fbb;"
| 2007-  || Loss||align=left| Nongbee Kiatyongyut || Rajadamnern Stadium || Bangkok, Thailand || Decision || 5 || 3:00
|-  style="background:#cfc;"
| 2007-06-25 || Win ||align=left| Sanchainoi W.Phetpoon || Wansongchai Fights, Rajadamnern Stadium || Bangkok, Thailand || Decision || 5 || 3:00
|-  style="background:#cfc;"
| 2007-05-10 || Win ||align=left| Singtongnoi Por.Telakun || Boxing Fight || Bangkok, Thailand || Decision (Unanimous) || 8 || 
|-  style="background:#cfc;"
| 2007-03-08 || Win ||align=left| Yodsanan 3K Battery || Wansongchai Fights, Rajadamnern Stadium || Bangkok, Thailand || Decision || 5 || 3:00
|-  style="background:#cfc;"
| 2006-10-19 || Win ||align=left| Rungrueangchai Daosiburi || Wansongchai Fights, Rajadamnern Stadium || Bangkok, Thailand || Decision || 5 || 3:00
|-  style="background:#fbb;"
| 2006-08-31 || Loss ||align=left| Watanasak Lukkuntara || Wansongchai Fights, Rajadamnern Stadium || Bangkok, Thailand || Decision || 5 || 3:00
|-  style="background:#fbb;"
| 2006-07-05 || Loss ||align=left| Watanaska Lukgantra || Onesongchai Promotion, Rajadamnern Stadium || Bangkok, Thailand || Decision || 5 || 3:00
|-  style="background:#cfc;"
| 2006-05-08 || Win ||align=left| Singtongnoi Por.Telakun || Wansongchai Fights, Rajadamnern Stadium || Bangkok, Thailand || Decision || 5 || 3:00
|-  style="background:#fbb;"
| 2006-04-06 || Loss ||align=left| Singtongnoi Por.Telakun || Wansongchai Fights, Rajadamnern Stadium || Bangkok, Thailand || Decision || 5 || 3:00

|-  style="background:#fbb;"
| 2006- || Loss ||align=left| Phetek Kiatyongyut || Wansongchai Fights, Rajadamnern Stadium || Bangkok, Thailand || TKO (Referee Stoppage)|| 1 ||

|-  style="background:#fbb;"
| 2005-11-16 || Loss ||align=left| Orono Tawan || Wansongchai Fights, Rajadamnern Stadium || Bangkok, Thailand || TKO || 4 || 
|-  style="background:#fbb;"
| 2005-09-22 || Loss ||align=left| Seanchainoi Seandeatgym || Wansongchai Fights, Rajadamnern Stadium || Bangkok, Thailand || Decision || 5 || 3:00
|-  style="background:#fbb;"
| 2005-08-12 || Loss ||align=left| Ronachai Naratrikun || Queens Birthday Superfights || Bangkok, Thailand || Decision || 5 || 3:00
|-  style="background:#cfc;"
| 2005-06-22 || Win ||align=left| Phetek Kiatyongyut || Kiatsingnoi Fights, Rajadamnern Stadium || Bangkok, Thailand || KO (Elbow)|| 3 || 
|-  style="background:#fbb;"
| 2005-03-07 || Loss ||align=left| Yodbuangarm Lukbanyai || Wansongchai Fights, Rajadamnern Stadium || Bangkok, Thailand || TKO || 2 ||
|-  style="background:#cfc;"
| 2005-02-12 || Win ||align=left| Phetek Kiatyongyut || One Songchai Tsunami Show, Rajamangala Stadium || Bangkok, Thailand || TKO (Elbow) || 3 ||
|-  style="background:#cfc;"
| 2004-12-29 || Win ||align=left| Rungravee S.Rungrot || Wansongchai Fights, Rajadamnern Stadium || Bangkok, Thailand || TKO || 5 || 
|-  style="background:#cfc;"
| 2004-11-01 || Win ||align=left| Rungravee 13Reanexpress || Wansongchai Fights, Rajadamnern Stadium || Bangkok, Thailand || Decision (Unanimous) || 5 || 3:00
|-  style="background:#fbb;"
| 2004-09-27 || Loss ||align=left| Saenchai Sor Kingstar || Wansongchai Fights, Rajadamnern Stadium || Bangkok, Thailand || TKO || 4 || 
|-  style="background:#cfc;"
| 2004-09-02 || Win ||align=left| Serhuanlak C.Sopipong || Wansongchai Fights, Rajadamnern Stadium || Bangkok, Thailand || TKO || 1 || 
|-  style="background:#cfc;"
| 2004-06-03 || Win ||align=left| Wanmechai Menayotin || Wansongchai Fights, Rajadamnern Stadium || Bangkok, Thailand || Decision (Unanimous) || 5 || 3:00
|-  style="background:#fbb;"
| 2003-11-27 || Loss ||align=left| Serhuanlak C.Sopipong || SUK Wansongchai, Rajadamnern Stadium || Bangkok, Thailand || Decision (Unanimous) || 5 || 3:00
|-  style="background:#fbb;"
| 2003-10-30 || Loss ||align=left| Puja S.Suwannee || SUK Wansongchai, Rajadamnern Stadium || Bangkok, Thailand || Decision (Unanimous) || 5 || 3:00
|-  style="background:#cfc;"
| 2003-10-05 || Win ||align=left| Kairung S.Sasipagym || SUK Wansongchai ITV, Rajadamnern Stadium || Bangkok, Thailand || Decision (Unanimous) || 5 || 3:00
|-  style="background:#cfc;"
| 2003-09-07 || Win ||align=left| Petchto Sitjaopor || SUK Wansongchai ITV, Rajadamnern Stadium || Bangkok, Thailand || Decision (Unanimous) || 5 || 3:00
|-  style="background:#fbb;"
| 2003-08-08 || Loss ||align=left| Kang YongGang ||The 4th China kung fu VS vocational muay Thai || Bangkok, Thailand || Decision (Unanimous) || 5 || 3:00
|- style="background:#c5d2ea;"
| 2003-04-26 || Draw||align=left| Ronnachai Naratreekul || OneSongchai || Chachoengsao Province, Thailand || Decision || 5 || 3:00

|-  style="background:#cfc;"
| 2002-12- || Win||align=left| Kongprai Por.Pinyo || Rajadamnern Stadium|| Bangkok, Thailand || KO || 3 || 
|-  style="background:#fbb;"
| 2002-11- || Loss||align=left| Kongprai Por.Pinyo || Rajadamnern Stadium|| Bangkok, Thailand || Decision  || 5 || 3:00
|-  style="background:#cfc;"
| 2002-10-09 || Win||align=left| Ngatao Atharungroj|| Rajadamnern Stadium|| Bangkok, Thailand || Decision  || 5 || 3:00
|-  style="background:#cfc;"
| 2002- || Win||align=left| Paruhat Sitchamee|| Rajadamnern Stadium|| Bangkok, Thailand || Decision  || 5 || 3:00
|-  style="background:#cfc;"
| 2002- || Win||align=left| Paruhat Sitchamee|| Rajadamnern Stadium|| Bangkok, Thailand || Decision  || 5 || 3:00
|-  style="background:#cfc;"
| 2002- || Win||align=left| Khrunoi Sor.kingstar || Rajadamnern Stadium|| Bangkok, Thailand || Decision  || 5 || 3:00
|-  style="background:#fbb;"
| 2002-05-21 || Loss ||align=left| Anuwat Kaewsamrit || Onesongchai || Bangkok, Thailand || TKO (Referee Stoppage) || 3 || 
|-  style="background:#fbb;"
| 2002- || Loss||align=left| Klairung Por.Sasipagym|| Rajadamnern Stadium|| Bangkok, Thailand || Decision  || 5 || 3:00
|-  style="background:#cfc;"
| 2002-03-20 || Win||align=left| Wuttidet Lukprabat || Rajadamnern Stadium|| Bangkok, Thailand || Decision  || 5 || 3:00
|-  style="background:#cfc;"
| 2002- || Win||align=left| Taweesak Singklongsi || Rajadamnern Stadium|| Bangkok, Thailand || Decision  || 5 || 3:00
|-  style="background:#fbb;"
| 2001-11-07 || Loss||align=left| Pornsanae Sitmonchai || Rajadamnern Stadium || Thailand || Decision || 5 || 3:00 
|-  style="background:#fbb;"
| 2001-09-05 || Loss ||align=left| Thongchai Tor. Silachai ||  Rajadamnern Stadium || Thailand || Decision || 5 || 3:00
|-  style="background:#fbb;"
| 2001-07-12 || Loss ||align=left| Thongchai Tor. Silachai ||  Rajadamnern Stadium || Thailand || Decision || 5 || 3:00
|-  style="background:#cfc;"
| 2001-06-07 || Win||align=left| Puja Sor.Suwanee || Rajadamnern Stadium || Thailand || KO || 2 || 
|-  style="background:#cfc;"
| 2001- || Win||align=left| Rungrit Sitchamtong || Rajadamnern Stadium|| Bangkok, Thailand || Decision || 5 ||3:00
|-  style="background:#cfc;"
| 2001- || Win||align=left| Chomputong Kiatniwat || Rajadamnern Stadium|| Bangkok, Thailand || KO || 4 ||
|-  style="background:#cfc;"
| 2001- || Win||align=left| Chanalert Yuthakij || Rajadamnern Stadium|| Bangkok, Thailand || Decision || 5 ||3:00 
|-  style="background:#cfc;"
| 2001- || Win||align=left| Thepparat Sakjawee || Rajadamnern Stadium|| Bangkok, Thailand || Decision || 5 ||3:00
|-  style="background:#cfc;"
|  || Win ||align=left| Palangchai ||  || Thailand ||  ||  || 
|-  style="background:#cfc;"
|  || Win ||align=left| Seanchainoi Seandeatgym ||  || Thailand ||  ||  || 
|-  style="background:#cfc;"
|  || Win ||align=left| Yodsanan Sityodtong ||  || Thailand ||  ||  || 

|-
| colspan=9 | Legend:

See also
List of male kickboxers

References

Living people
1984 births
Featherweight kickboxers
Lightweight kickboxers
Welterweight kickboxers
Bovy Sor Udomson
Bovy Sor Udomson